Sighvatur Kristinn Björgvinsson (born 23 January 1942) is an Icelandic politician and former minister. He was the Minister of Finance of Iceland from 1979 to 1980.

References

External links 
 Non auto-biography of Sighvatur Kristinn Björgvinsson on the parliament website

|-

|-

1942 births
Finance ministers of Iceland
Sighvatur Kristinn Bjorgvinsson
Living people
Social Democratic Party (Iceland) politicians